Italian Baroque architecture refers to Baroque architecture in Italy.

Central Italy

Rome

The Baroque architecture period began in the Italian period of the basilica with crossed dome and nave. One of the first Roman structures to break with the Mannerist conventions (as exemplified in the Church of the Gesù) was the church of Church of Saint Susanna, designed by Carlo Maderno in 1596. The dynamic organisation of columns and pilasters, central massing, and the protrusion and condensed central decoration add complexity to the structure. Most Baroque buildings present domes. There is an emerging playfulness with the rules of classic design, still maintaining rigour. 

The same emphasis on plasticity, continuity and dramatic effects is evident in the work of Pietro da Cortona, illustrated by Santi Luca e Martina (1635) and Santa Maria della Pace (1656). Santa Maria della Pace, with its concave wings devised to simulate a theatrical set, fills a tiny piazza in front of it. Other Roman ensembles of the period are likewise suffused with theatricality, dominating the surrounding cityscape as a sort of theatrical environment.

Probably the best known example of such an approach is trapezoidal Saint Peter's Square, which has been praised as a masterpiece of Baroque architecture. The square is divided in two parts, designed by Gian Lorenzo Bernini on an unprecedented colossal scale to suit the space and evoke awe. Bernini's own favourite design was the polychromatic oval church of Sant'Andrea al Quirinale (1658), which, with its lofty altar and soaring dome, provides a concentrated sampling of the new architecture. His idea of the Baroque townhouse is typified by the Palazzo Barberini (1629) and Palazzo Chigi-Odescalchi (1664), both in Rome.

Bernini's chief rival in the papal capital was Francesco Borromini, whose designs deviate from the regular compositions of the ancient world and Renaissance even more dramatically. Acclaimed by later generations as a revolutionary in architecture, Borromini condemned the anthropomorphic approach of the 16th century, choosing to base his designs on complicated geometric figures (modules). Borromini's architectural space seems to expand and contract when needed, showing some affinity with the late style of Michelangelo. His iconic masterpiece is the church of San Carlo alle Quattro Fontane, distinguished by a corrugated oval plan and complex convex-concave rhythms. A later work, Sant'Ivo alla Sapienza, displays the same antipathy to the flat surface and playful inventiveness, epitomized by a corkscrew lantern dome.

Following the death of Bernini in 1680, Carlo Fontana emerged as the most influential architect working in Rome. His early style is exemplified by the slightly concave façade of San Marcello al Corso. Fontana's academic approach, though lacking in the dazzling inventiveness of his Roman predecessors, exerted substantial influence on Baroque architecture both through his prolific writings and through a number of architects whom he trained and who disseminated the Baroque idioms throughout 18th-century Europe.

The 18th century saw the capital of Europe's architectural world transferred from Rome to Paris. The Italian Rococo, which flourished in Rome from the 1720s onward, was profoundly influenced by Borromini's ideas. The most talented architects active in Rome – Francesco de Sanctis (Spanish Steps, 1723) and Filippo Raguzzini (Piazza Sant'Ignazio, 1727) – had little influence outside their native country, as did numerous practitioners of the Sicilian Baroque, including Giovanni Battista Vaccarini, Andrea Palma, and Giuseppe Venanzio Marvuglia.

Southern Italy

Naples

The last phase of Baroque architecture in Italy is exemplified by Luigi Vanvitelli's Caserta Palace, reputedly the largest building erected in Europe in the 18th century. Indebted to contemporary French and Spanish models, the palace is skillfully related to the landscape. In Naples and Caserta, Vanvitelli practiced a sober classicizing academic style, with equal attention to aesthetics and engineering, a style that would make an easy transition to Neoclassicism.

Sicily

Sicilian Baroque is the distinctive form of Baroque architecture that took hold on the island of Sicily, off the southern coast of Italy, in the seventeenth and eighteenth centuries. The style is recognizable not only by its typical Baroque curves and flourishes, but also by its grinning masks and putti and a particular flamboyance that has given Sicily a unique architectural identity.

The Sicilian Baroque style came to fruition during a major surge of rebuilding following a massive earthquake in 1693. Previously, the Baroque style had been used on the island in a naïve and parochial manner, having evolved from hybrid native architecture rather than being derived from the great Baroque architects of Rome. After the earthquake, local architects, many of them trained in Rome, were given plentiful opportunities to recreate the more sophisticated Baroque architecture that had become popular in mainland Italy; the work of these local architects – and the new genre of architectural engravings that they pioneered – inspired more local architects to follow their lead. Around 1730, Sicilian architects had developed a confidence in their use of the Baroque style. Their particular interpretation led to further evolution to a personalised and highly localised art form on the island. From the 1780s onwards, the style was gradually replaced by the newly-fashionable Neoclassicism.

The highly decorative Sicilian Baroque period lasted barely fifty years, and perfectly reflected the social order of the island at a time when, nominally ruled by Spain, it was in fact governed by a wealthy and often extravagant aristocracy, who controlled the primarily agricultural economy. Its Baroque architecture gives the island an architectural character used well into the 21st century.

North Italy

Turin

In the north of Italy, notably Turin, the monarchs from the House of Savoy were particularly receptive to the new style. They employed a brilliant triad of architects—Guarino Guarini, Filippo Juvarra and Bernardo Vittone—to illustrate the grandiose political ambitions and the newly acquired royal status of their dynasty.

Guarini was a peripatetic monk who combined many traditions (including that of Gothic architecture) to create irregular structures remarkable for their oval columns and unconventional façades. Building upon the findings of contemporary geometry and stereotomy, Guarini elaborated the concept of architectura obliqua, which approximated Borromini's style in both theoretical and structural audacity. Guarini's Palazzo Carignano (1679) may have been the most flamboyant application of the Baroque style to the design of a private house in the 17th century.

Fluid forms, weightless details and airy prospects of Juvarra's architecture anticipated the art of Rococo. Although his practice ranged well beyond Turin, Juvarra's most impressive designs were created for Victor Amadeus II of Sardinia. The visual impact of his Basilica of Superga (1717) derives from its soaring roofline and masterful placement on a hill above Turin. Rustic ambience encouraged a freer articulation of architectural form at the royal hunting lodge of the Palazzina di Stupinigi (1729). Juvarra finished his short but eventful career in Madrid, where he worked on the royal palaces at La Granja and Aranjuez.

Among the many who were profoundly influenced by the brilliance and diversity of Juvarra and Guarini, the most prominent was Bernardo Vittone. This Piedmontese architect is remembered for an outcrop of flamboyant Rococo churches, quatrefoil in plan and delicate in detailing. His sophisticated designs often feature multiple vaults, structures within structures and domes within domes.

Milan

Francesco Maria Richini (1584–1658) was the most important Milanese architect.

Between 1607 and 1630 he built the Church of San Giuseppe, which, like Church of the Gesù in Rome, was meant to practice the excess over the Mannerist academic vogue until then.
Richini introduced a combined plan, consisting of two central areas derived from Church of Sant'Alessandro in Zebedia, also in Milan; the plastic effect is also noticeable in the façade, decorated by a series of overlapping niches.

Subsequently, in 1627 he devoted himself to the façade of the Collegio Elvetico (now the seat of Archivio di Stato), where he aimed at an integration between the interior and exterior through a concave prospectus. This interesting solution, possibly the first curved façade of the Baroque period, predates certain themes later expressed by Borromini, and confirms Richini as one of the greatest architects of the early Baroque.

Venice

The Venetian Baroque, according to local practice, saw Baldassarre Longhena (1598–1682) as its principal exponent. After the pestilence of 1630, he began the construction of the Church of Santa Maria della Salute, using a central plan. In the octagonal body of the basilica, Longhena added a sanctuary bordered on either side by two apses, similar to that adopted by Andrea Palladio in Il Redentore; this solution strengthens the longitudinal axis of the temple, which in fact became the central body in the proper nave. The Baroque style of the church is evident in the conformation of the external mass, located along the Grand Canal: the octagonal body, covered by a large dome, is flanked by the crown of the shrine and two bell towers.

Longhena also worked within civic architecture; its Ca' Pesaro presents a seemingly conventional plan, but the play of light and shadows that are set on the richly ornate façade leads to a typically Baroque style.

In any case, the exasperation of Loghena's plastic art details peaked in the façade of Santa Maria dei Derelitti (completed in the 1670s), decorated in a fancy and rich way with atlantes, giant heads and lion masks.

Genoa
In Genoa since the end of the 16th century, Baroque architecture saw the construction of a series of large buildings that critics have deemed among the most important of the Italian landscape. Among these was the Palazzo Doria Tursi, where the planimetric configuration of the vestibule, combined with the highest indoor garden through a wide staircase, declares the presence of a movement in depth.

This solution was taken up by Bartolomeo Bianco (1590–1657) in what may be considered his masterpiece: the college of the Jesuits, which later became the headquarters of the University of Genoa (1634, approximately). The building has a U-shaped plan, but compared to previous one shows greater permeability between the inside and the yard; in fact, using the conformation of the very steep terrain, Bianco created a unique urban scenery, with a porch as wide as the yard and a series of overlapping arches and stairways.

See also

 Italian Baroque
 Italian Baroque interior design
 Timeline of Italian architecture

References

 01
Italy
Baroque architectural styles
Architectural history
Architectural styles
architecture